Duvier Riascos (born 26 June 1986) is a Colombian professional football player who plays as a forward. He is known as the "Snake" mainly due to his celebration when he scores.

Club career

Shanghai Shenhua FC
On 1 February 2010, it was announced that Riascos joined Shanghai Shenhua on loan from América de Cali. Riascos made his Chinese Super League debut on 27 March, in a 0–2 away loss to Changsha Ginde. He scored his first goal for Shanghai on his second appearance, in a 2–1 away win over Nanchang Bayi on 3 April. Riascos won the Golden Boot Award after scoring 20 goals in 28 appearances in the 2010 Chinese Super League season.

Puebla FC
Duvier was sent out on loan to Mexican Primera División club Puebla on 8 July 2011.
Riascos made his debut for Puebla on 23 July 2011 against Atlas coming in as a sub in the second half playing only 22 minutes. Riascos scored his first goal as a starter in minute 21 winning 2–0 in the first half before Pachuca tied the game 2–2. Riascos ended his first season well with 6 goals in 16 games before he was sold to Tijuana.

Cruzeiro
On 16 January 2015 Riascos was signed by Cruzeiro on a three-year contract.

Dalian Yifang
On 21 June 2018, Riascos signed with Dalian Yifang for one and a half year on a free transfer from Vasco Da Gama. His physical condition was not at his best throughout the season and received many criticism, but he scored a critical header to save Dalian Yifang from relegation in the last league match.

Universidad Católica
On 28 February 2019, Chilean Primera División club Universidad Católica announced the signing Riascos on a one-year loan contract.

Career statistics

Club statistics
.

Honours

Club
Tijuana
 Liga MX: Apertura 2012

Morelia
 Supercopa MX: 2014

Vasco da Gama
 Campeonato Carioca: 2016

Millonarios
 Categoría Primera A: 2017–II
Universidad Católica
 Primera División de Chile (1): 2019
 Supercopa de Chile (1): 2019

Individual
 Copa Venezuela Top Scorer: 2008
 Chinese Football Association Footballer of the Year: 2010
 Chinese Super League Golden Boot Winner: 2010
 Campeonato Carioca Team of the year: 2016

References

External links
 

1986 births
Living people
People from Buenaventura, Valle del Cauca
Colombian footballers
Colombian expatriate footballers
Association football forwards
América de Cali footballers
Real Cartagena footballers
Estudiantes de Mérida players
Deportivo Cali footballers
Shanghai Shenhua F.C. players
Club América footballers
Club Puebla players
Club Tijuana footballers
C.F. Pachuca players
Atlético Morelia players
Cruzeiro Esporte Clube players
CR Vasco da Gama players
Millonarios F.C. players
Dalian Professional F.C. players
Club Deportivo Universidad Católica footballers
Club Always Ready players
Alianza F.C. footballers
Categoría Primera A players
Liga MX players
Bolivian Primera División players
Chinese Super League players
Chilean Primera División players
Campeonato Brasileiro Série A players
Campeonato Brasileiro Série B players
Expatriate footballers in Venezuela
Expatriate footballers in Chile
Expatriate footballers in Mexico
Expatriate footballers in China
Expatriate footballers in Brazil
Expatriate footballers in Bolivia
Expatriate footballers in El Salvador
Colombian expatriate sportspeople in Venezuela
Colombian expatriate sportspeople in Chile
Colombian expatriate sportspeople in Mexico
Colombian expatriate sportspeople in China
Colombian expatriate sportspeople in Brazil
Colombian expatriate sportspeople in Bolivia
Colombian expatriate sportspeople in El Salvador
Sportspeople from Valle del Cauca Department
21st-century Colombian people